Rudolph Frank Kneisch (April 10, 1899 – April 6, 1965) was an American professional baseball player who played in two games for the Detroit Tigers during the  season.
He was born in Baltimore, Maryland and died there at the age of 65.

External links

Major League Baseball pitchers
Baseball players from Baltimore
Detroit Tigers players
1899 births
1965 deaths